Jack Whitam (born 1981) is an English born actor.

Whitam studied acting at Bristol Old Vic Theatre School. Shortly after graduating in 2003, he went on to join the Royal Shakespeare Company for their Tragedies Season where he appeared as Lennox in Macbeth directed by Dominic Cooke and Burgundy in King Lear directed by Bill Alexander. He also appeared in a newly devised piece called PILATE directed by Michael Boyd

Whitam has appeared in a large number of Shakespeare plays during his career, notably as Caliban in Sprite Productions version of The Tempest which was set on a real island in the lakes of Ripley Castle and as Touchstone in As You Like It which was directed by The Factory Theatre Company artistic director Alex Hassell, where he was lauded as a 'comic tour de force' Review

Whitam is also a founder member of The Factory Theatre Company.

Jack Whitam IMDb

1981 births
Living people
English male stage actors
English male television actors